Gravel was a Lithuanian rock band. In 2006, the band performed at Lithuanian Eurovision preliminaries and took fourth place.

Biography
The band was officially created in 2003 and consisted of Tomaš Sinicki, his brother Miroslav Sinicki, Vladislav Gaiževski and Erik Ševčuvianec, childhood friends.

In 2006 the band released their first album Pockets Full of Fun.

In 2007 Gravel was awarded as the "Best rock band" by A.lt, a Lithuanian alternative music awards show. They also claimed an award of the "Year's best debut" in both Pravda and Bravo awards. Gravel also filmed their first music video "Easter song" that was broadcast by MTV.

Their second album Dirty Beauty was released on April 1st, 2008 on the web and was available to download for free (the first Lithuanian album distributed in this way). Even before this album release, the band leader Tomas announced that Gravel is to be disbanded.

Discography
 Pockets Full of Fun (2006)
 Dirty Beauty (2008)

External links
 Dirty Beauty announcement and download source on Delfi.lt

Lithuanian musical groups
Lithuanian rock music groups